{{Automatic taxobox
| taxon = Schroederiella
| authority = Woloszynska
| image= Schroederiella africana.jpg
| image_caption = Schroederiella africana
| subdivision_ranks = Species
| subdivision = 
 '}}Schroederiella' is a genus of green algae in the family Scenedesmaceae.

The genus was circumscribed by Jadwiga Woloszynska in Hedwigia vol.55 on pages 198, 210, 223 in 1914.

The genus name of Schroederiella is in honour of Ludwig Julius Bruno Schröder (1867–1928), who was a German teacher, botanist (Algology and Bryology), also Hydrobiologist and Zoologist. He worked as a deputy head teacher in Breslau.

Species
As accepted by WoRMS;
 Schroederiella papillata 
 Schroederiella africana''

References

External links

Sphaeropleales genera
Sphaeropleales